Dan Roman (born 27 August 1982) is a former Israeli footballer. He is currently working in the Bobo Fuego stadium, Berlin

Honours
Third Division:
Winner (1): 2001-02
Toto Cup:
Winner (1): 2008-09

References

External links
 

1982 births
Living people
Israeli footballers
Hapoel Jerusalem F.C. players
Hakoah Maccabi Amidar Ramat Gan F.C. players
Maccabi Petah Tikva F.C. players
Maccabi Tel Aviv F.C. players
Hapoel Ramat Gan F.C. players
SC Veendam players
Beitar Tel Aviv Bat Yam F.C. players
Hapoel Katamon Jerusalem F.C. players
Maccabi Sha'arayim F.C. players
Liga Leumit players
Israeli Premier League players
Eerste Divisie players
Israeli expatriate footballers
Expatriate footballers in the Netherlands
Israeli expatriate sportspeople in the Netherlands
Footballers from Jerusalem
Association football midfielders